Choe Hang (?–1024) was a civil minister (called munsin) of the Gyeongju Choe clan during the Goryeo dynasty. In 991, the 10th year of King Seongjong's reign, as he passed gwageo or civil minister exam, with the highest point, he entered to the court. When Kim Chi-yang (金致陽) plotted to throne his natural born son in 1009, the 12th year of King Mokjong's reign, Choe prevented the conspiracy by helping Hyeonjong, to ascend the throne along with Chae Chung-sun. In 1010, when he served as the post of Jeongdang munhak (政堂文學), he revived Palgwanhoe (八關會), a national Buddhist festival that had been ceased for the past 30 years.

See also 
Korean Buddhism
Hyeonjong of Goryeo

References

11th-century Korean people
Goryeo Buddhists
Gyeongju Choe clan
1024 deaths
Year of birth unknown